Aphrodite Glacier is a glacier  long flowing north to the east coast of the Antarctic Peninsula  west of Victory Nunatak.

History
The lower portion of the feature was first plotted by W.L.G. Joerg from aerial photographs taken by Sir Hubert Wilkins in December 1928 and by Lincoln Ellsworth in November 1935. The glacier was subsequently photographed by the Ronne Antarctic Research Expedition in December 1947 (Trimetrogon air photography) and surveyed by the Falkland Islands Dependencies Survey in December 1958 and November 1960. It was named by the UK Antarctic Place-Names Committee after Aphrodite, the goddess of love in Greek mythology.

See also
 List of glaciers in the Antarctic
 Glaciology

References 

Glaciers of Bowman Coast